Pyrazole is an organic compound with the formula C3H3N2H. It is a heterocycle characterized by a 5-membered ring of three carbon atoms and two adjacent nitrogen atoms, which are in ortho-substitution. Pyrazole is a weak base, with pKb 11.5 (pKa of the conjugate acid 2.49 at 25 °C). Pyrazoles are also a class of compounds that have the ring C3N2 with adjacent nitrogen atoms. Notable drugs containing a pyrazole ring are celecoxib (celebrex) and the anabolic steroid stanozolol.

Preparation and reactions
Pyrazoles are synthesized by the reaction of α,β-unsaturated aldehydes with hydrazine and subsequent dehydrogenation:

Substituted pyrazoles are prepared by condensation of 1,3-diketones with hydrazine (Knorr-type reactions). For example, acetylacetone and hydrazine gives 3,5-dimethylpyrazole:
CH3C(O)CH2C(O)CH3   +   N2H4   →   (CH3)2C3HN2H   +   2 H2O

History
The term pyrazole was given to this class of compounds by German Chemist Ludwig Knorr in 1883. In a classical method developed by German chemist Hans von Pechmann in 1898, pyrazole was synthesized from acetylene and diazomethane.

Conversion to scorpionates
Pyrazoles react with potassium borohydride to form a class of ligands known as scorpionate. Pyrazole itself reacts with potassium borohydride at high temperatures (~200 °C) to form a tridentate ligand known as Tp ligand:

3,5-Diphenyl-1H-pyrazole
3,5-Diphenyl-1H-pyrazole is produced when (E)-1,3-diphenylprop-2-en-1-one is reacted with hydrazine hydrate in the presence of elemental sulfur or sodium persulfate, or by using a hydrazone in which case an azine is produced as a by-product.

Occurrence and uses

In 1959, the first natural pyrazole, 1-pyrazolyl-alanine, was isolated from seeds of watermelons.

In medicine, derivatives of pyrazole are widely used, including celecoxib and similar COX-2 inhibitors, zaleplon, betazole, and CDPPB.

The pyrazole ring is found within a variety of pesticides as fungicides, insecticides and herbicides, including fenpyroximate, fipronil, tebufenpyrad and tolfenpyrad. Pyrazole moieties are listed among the highly used ring systems for small molecule drugs by the US FDA

See also
3,5-dimethylpyrazole
Pyrazolidine, fully saturated analogue 
imidazole, structural analogue of pyrazole with two non-adjacent nitrogen atoms.
isoxazole, another analogue, the nitrogen atom in position 1 replaced by oxygen.

References

Further reading

 
Aromatic bases
Simple aromatic rings